May week may refer to:

May Week, the week-long May Revolution that took place in 1810 in Argentina
May Week, the celebratory week at the end of the academic year at Cambridge University